The Danyang Ji clan (Hangul: 단양 피씨, Hanja: 丹陽 皮氏) was one of the Korean clans. Their bon-gwan was in Danyang County, North Chungcheong Province. According to the 2000 census, the number of members was 1399. Their founder was  who was a Jinwu Guard Commander (Hanja: 金吾後衛指揮) in the Yuan Empire. He was dispatched to Goryeo as an envoy during Chungnyeol of Goryeo’s reign. After that, he was naturalized and began the Danyang Ji clan after Ji In-go (皮寅古), his older brother, was chosen as Prince of Danyang (丹山君).

See also 
 Korean clan names of foreign origin

References

External links 
 

 
Korean clan names of Chinese origin